Darya Sar or Daryasar may refer to:
 Daryasar, Gilan
 Darya Sar, Mazandaran
 Darya Sar, Fereydunkenar, Mazandaran Province
 Daryasar Rural District, in Gilan Province